Freeborn is both a surname and a given name. Notable people with the name include:

Surname:
Charles James Freeborn (died 1919), American United States Army soldier of World War I
Frederick Freeborn, a member of Hut 7 at Bletchley Park in World War II
Glenn Freeborn (born 1973), Australian rules footballer
James Freeborn (1876–?), Canadian sport shooter
John Freeborn (1919–2010), British World War II flying ace and Royal Air Force officer
Scott Freeborn (born 1978), Scottish footballer
Stanley B. Freeborn (1891–1960), Chancellor of University of California, Davis 
Stuart Freeborn (1914–2013), English make-up artist
William Freeborn (1816–1900), pioneer in Minnesota, Montana, and California
William Freeborn (settler) (1594–1670), founding settler of Portsmouth, Rhode Island

Given name:
Freeborn Garrettson (1752–1827), American clergyman
Freeborn Garretson Hibbard (1811–1895), American Methodist minister, theologian and writer
Freeborn G. Jewett (1791–1858), American lawyer and politician

See also
Harrison J. Freebourn (1890–1954), Justice of the Montana Supreme Court